Więcbork is a town in northern Poland, located in the Sępólno County in the Kuyavian-Pomeranian Voivodeship. In 2019 it had a population of 5,965. It is located within the ethnocultural region of Krajna.

History

After 960 the town was part of Piast Poland under Mieszko I. It is first mentioned under the name Wanszowna in historical records in the chronicle of Jan of Czarnków in 1383. The first record instance of the name Więcbork occurred in 1405. The town was part of the Kingdom of Poland and it was a private town, which belonged to various Polish magnates. Administratively it was located in the Nakło County in the Kalisz Voivodeship in the Greater Poland Province of the Polish Crown.

After the First Partition of Poland in 1772 the town  became part of Kingdom of Prussia, under the name Vandsburg. In 1807 Więcbork was regained by Poles and included within the short-lived Duchy of Warsaw and in 1815 it was reannexed by Prussia, where it was administratively part of the Flatow district (Landkreis Flatow) until 1920, when the eastern part of the district with 30,516 inhabitants (including 8,600 Poles) and the towns of Kamień Krajeński, Sępólno Krajeńskie and Więcbork were reintegrated with the re-established Polish Republic after the Treaty of Versailles. The town became part of Sępólno County, under the restored Polish name Więcbork.

Sępólno County was invaded and annexed by Nazi Germany in 1939, and the town now became part of Landkreis Zempelburg, under the name Vandsburg. During the German invasion, the Einsatzgruppe IV entered the town on to commit atrocities against Poles. During the German occupation, Poles were subject to persecutions, mass arrests, expulsions and massacres. Numerous Poles were imprisoned in a concentration camp in Radzim and in a prison established by the Selbstschutz in Sępólno Krajeńskie, and later murdered there or deported to other Nazi concentration camps. Mass arrests of Poles were carried out from September 1939. In 1945 the town was restored to Poland.

Number of inhabitants by years

Sports
Grom Więcbork sports club is based in Więcbork, with football, athletics, weightlifting, chess and duplicate bridge sections.

References 

Cities and towns in Kuyavian-Pomeranian Voivodeship
Sępólno County
Pomeranian Voivodeship (1919–1939)